Julia Kassar is a Lebanese actress, who is known for her roles in Lebanese cinema and theater. She has worked with many famous directors such as Nidal Al Achkar, Jawad al-Assadi, Jalal Khoury, and Roger Assaf. She received a Master diploma in Audiovisual arts in theater from the Holy Spirit University of Kaslik. She is also an academic teacher at the Lebanese University.

Works

Films

Series

Stages

Awards

References

1963 births
Living people
Lebanese film actresses
Lebanese stage actresses
Lebanese television actresses
Academic staff of Lebanese University
Actresses from Beirut
Holy Spirit University of Kaslik alumni